Edward Rupert Lavender Thomas (24 June 1891 – 16 January 1953) was an Australian rules footballer who played with Collingwood in the Victorian Football League (VFL).

Notes

External links 

Eddie Thomas's profile at Collingwood Forever

1891 births
1953 deaths
Australian rules footballers from Victoria (Australia)
Collingwood Football Club players